Trigoniaceae is a family of flowering plants, consisting of 28 species in five genera. It is a tropical family found in Madagascar, Southeast Asia, Central and South America.

References

Malpighiales families